Wasserzug Étienne Bronislaw (born 1 August 1860 in Motol; died 1888) was a French biologist of Polish origin.

Biography 
1863-1870 after the defeat of the Polish uprising against Russia, his father was sentenced to death. He managed to escape with one of their children-Etienne. He finds refuge in Neuchâtel (Switzerland), and then hides in le-Saunier (Jura, France).

During the 1870-1871 conflict with Prussia, his father enlisted as a medical officer in the French army. After the war, disillusioned with the attitude of the French administration, he entrusted his son to a  woman and leaves him to go to America. .

1877-1879 Etienne went and lived in Budapest (Hungary), where he accepted a position as tutor in a wealthy Hungarian family.

1879-1880 returning to France he has become a master in teaching high school in Besançon, and then in college Salins (Jura). Preparing to receive a Bachelor of Arts and is preparing for the competition "Ecole Normale Supérieure".

In 1881, he is a teacher at the Lycée Saint-Louis (Paris).

1882  he receives a bachelor's degree and passes an entrance exam for the "Ecole Normale". He learns history at the Ecole Normale section.

In the years 1885-1888, as an assistant coach of the laboratory of Louis Pasteur in the "Ecole Normale" he is working on the production of «Invertin» of some fungi, morphology and physiology of bacteria and fungi. He's working on a rabies treatment.

In 1888, he died in Paris of scarlet fever. Louis Pasteur made a speech at his funeral.

Personal life 
After escaping with his father, Etienne did not see the rest of his family. After his father went to America (Argentina), he was alone.

He was fluent  in several languages including Latin, Anglo-Saxon and Slavic.

References

External links 
 Bibliography

19th-century biologists
Polish biologists
1860 births
1888 deaths
French people of Polish descent